Sfax is a city in Tunisia, located  southeast of Tunis. The city, founded in AD849 on the ruins of Berber Taparura, is the capital of the Sfax Governorate (about 955,421 inhabitants in 2014), and a Mediterranean port. Sfax has a population of 330,440 (census 2014). The main industries are phosphate, olive and nut processing, fishing (largest fishing port in Tunisia) and international trade. The city is the second-most populous after the capital, Tunis.

History

Carthaginian and Aghlabid eras 

Present-day Sfax was founded in AD849 on the site of the Berber town of Taparura. The modern city has also grown to cover some other ancient settlements, most notably Thenae in its southern suburb of Thyna.

Almohad era 
By the end of the 10th century, Sfax had become an independent city-state. The city was conquered by Roger II of Sicily in 1148 and occupied until it was liberated in 1156 by the Almohads, and was briefly occupied by European forces again, this time by the Spanish, in the 16th century, before falling into Ottoman hands. Sfax became an integral base of the Barbary piracy, prompting an unsuccessful invasion by Venice in 1785.

Hafsid era 
Abou Yahya Abou Bekr finally re-established Hafsid unity and recaptured Kerkennah from the Christians in 1335. The peace returned to the country was only disturbed by rare episodes, the most lasting of which began with the price of Sfax by the dissident brothers, Ahmed and Abdelmalèk ben Makki.

Towards 1370, following the arrival of Caliph Abdul-Abbbas, Sfax returned under the Hafside era.

After more than three centuries which had seen the preponderance of the Hafsids be maintained, the conflict between the Turks and the Spaniards would precipitate the fall of their dynasty. In 1534, the privateer Barberousse enters Tunis, proclaims the decline of the Hafsids and effortlessly reunites the towns of the coast and among them the town of Sfax.

Husseinid era 
The founder of the new dynasty, Hussein, gave the country unquestionable economic prosperity. In Sfax, the mosque is enlarged, which regains its original extent; the new mihrâb is dated 1758, the work was completed in 1783.

The ramparts were restored and two large reservoirs were built to supplement the Nasriah cisterns. In 1776, the southern suburb of the city, the Frankish quarter, was built, reserved for Jews and Christians, a major place of maritime trade, but which was also to serve as a buffer against sea attacks, which were still to be feared. The eventuality was not long in coming, the Venetians bombarding Sfax four times in the space of two years (1785–86). A large fort was built during the siege to flank Borj Ennar; it was demolished after the last war.

Around 1830, the Frankish quarter was surrounded by a wall and in 1860 the city had a post office and telegraph. In 1876, the telegraph clerk made a plan of the city and told us about a signal tower built a century earlier and of which we have lost track.

French era 

When the Bey of Tunis signed the Bardo Treaty, in 1881, making Tunisia a protectorate, an insurrection broke out in Sfax. Six ironclads were dispatched from Toulon (Colbert, Friedland, Marengo, Trident, Revanche, Surveillante) to join the French Navy ships in Tunisian waters. In Sfax, three ironclads from the Division of the Levant were already present (Alma, Reine Blanche, La Galissonnière), together with four cannon boats. Sfax was bombarded, and on 16 July the city was taken by the French after hard fighting, with 7 dead and 32 wounded for the French.

World War II 

During World War II, the Axis powers used the city as a major base until British forces took it on 10 April 1943. After World War II, Tunisia was returned to France, but gained independence in 1956.

Geography

Climate 
Sfax has a hot semi-arid climate (Köppen BSh). Owing to its sheltered location relative to Mediterranean Sea winter storms, Sfax receives half the rainfall of Tunis and less even than the major cities of Libya (Tripoli and Benghazi). Summers, like all of North Africa, are hot and almost rainless, whilst winters are very pleasant with usually only light rain.

Topography 
The topography of the governorate of Sfax tilts regularly from the west to the coast and local presents small hills and mountain ranges in the form of elongated draâs.

Relief 
Sfax is characterized by a monotonous, low and slightly uneven relief. The altitude y rarely exceed 250 m, especially in the center-west of the governorate (Draâ Lahirech, 269 m; Djebel Chebka, 255 m). Most of the study site extends over wide plains not exceeding the 150 m above sea level, including a low coastal strip about 15 km wide and having an average altitude of 20 m.

Hydrography 
The monotonous character, low and not very rugged of the topography largely determined the characteristics hydrographic in the governorate of Sfax. Indeed, the rivers are numerous, shallow and rarely reaches the sea. The hills and small mountain ranges of the center-west present a hydrographic hairline dense and relatively deep compared to the coastal strip. Like a few exoreic rivers (wadi Agareb, wadi Laâchech, wadi El Maleh), most of the Wadis are endorheic, leading to closed depressions of the sebkhas and garâas type. Depending on their morpho-structural conditions, these closed depressions take the form of basins synclinal (Menzel Chaker and Hancha regions) or the form of sebkhas and garâas (Noual, Bou Jmal, Mchiguigue, Karafita... etc.).

Neighborhoods 
Whether in the city center or between the radial roads, there are large, popular neighborhoods in Sfax, most of which are:
 Hay El Rabdh
 Hay El Habib
 Hay El Bahri
 Hay Bourguiba
 Hay El Badrani
 Hay Ennasr
 Hay El Maez
 Hay Thyna

Politics and administration

Mayor and municipality 

The current Mayor of the city is Mounir Elloumi (belonging to Ennahdha), elected is the occasion of 2018 Tunisian local elections

Administrative division 

The Governorate of Sfax has 16 municipalities :

Demographics 

In 2019, the population of Sfax has reached 1,013,021 inhabitants. The urban population represents 63.7% of the population. In 2014 the Males represent 50.2% of the population structure with a population of 140,752. As to the Females, they represent 49.1% with a population of 139,814.

Architecture and urbanism

Medina 

The Medina represents one of the most important quarters of Sfax. it plays a touristic and historical role of the city. It was built by Aghlabid prince Abu Abbass Muhammad between 849 and 851. The medina is home to about 113,000 residents and is dominated by the Great Mosque of Sfax.

Walls and gates 

Apart from Borj Ennar and three other towers that disappeared, the walls of the medina kept the same original architecture since 1306. These are 2,750 meters long and have 34 dungeons. Their height varies between seven and eleven meters.

Originally, the medina had only two doors: Bab Jebli, also known as Bab Dhahraoui (northern door), and Bab Diwan or Bab Bahr (the sea door). Yet, in the 20th century and because of the economic development and the huge increase of the population, new doors had to be created to reduce the flow from these two main doors such as Bab El Ksar and Bab Jebli Jedid.

Kasbah 

Like most of the other medinas of Tunisia, Sfax has its own kasbah. It is a desert fortress, located in the southwestern corner of the medina. It was used for different purposes throughout history, first, a control tower built by the Aghlabids on the coast, then the seat of the municipal government, and then the main army barracks. Its construction was preceded by the deployment of the wall and the medina quarter. Today it is served as a museum of traditional architecture.

Mausoleums and mosques 
Also here are the Sidi Amar Kammoun Mausoleum, Sidi Ali Ennouri Mausoleum, Sidi Belhassen Karray Mausoleum, El Ajouzine Mosque, Bouchouaicha Mosque, Driba Mosque and Sidi Elyes Mosque.

City hall 
The city hall of Sfax is in the center of the modern city and opens on Habib Bourguiba Street in parallel with the main entrance of the historic city. The Municipal Palace draws attention to the magnificence and beauty of its exterior architecture and its interior decorations and masterpieces. This unique landmark was designed by French architect Rafael Guy, who blended the Arab-Moriscan character with the European character
The project of the construction of the Palace of the scourge began at the beginning of the twentieth century, where the municipality issued a tender for this purpose in the newspaper Adebash Svaxian on 30 June 1904 and began construction works in late 1905 and ended in 1906
In 1912, he began to expand gradually until around 1943
After the Second World War, the town hall was completed in 1955.

Cityscape

Culture 

The city of Sfax includes an archaeological museum, located in the municipal building and is open during the hours of municipal services, which includes a collection of ancient archaeological discoveries in the city and in the close sites, including the ancient city Thanae (Thyna); its collections include pieces dating from prehistoric, Roman and Islamic. Sfax also contains a museum of arts and traditions located in the medina called Dar Jallouli.

Education 

Sfax concentrates the main educational institutions of the south of the Sahel:

The University of Sfax includes:
 ENIS (École Nationale d'Ingénieurs de Sfax) issued a number of well-known scientists and industrialists.
 ESCS (École Supérieure de Commerce de Sfax) issued a number of managers, Economy and Management researchers and young entrepreneurs.
 FLSHS (Faculté des Lettres et des Sciences Humaines de Sfax) issued a number of renowned poets and prose writers.
 Sfax Faculty of Medicine (Faculté de Médecine de Sfax).
 ISAAS (Institut Supérieur d'Administration des Affaires de Sfax)
 FSEGS (Faculté des Sciences Économiques et de Gestion de Sfax).
 FSS (Faculty of Science Sfax) .
 ISIMS (Institut Supérieur d'Informatique et de Multimédia de Sfax).
 FDS (Faculté de Droit de Sfax)<http://www.fdsf.rnu.tn/>
 ISAMS (Institut Supérieur des Arts et Métiers de Sfax)
 IHEC (Institut des Hautes Etudes Commerciales de Sfax)

The North American Private University was founded in 2012 and brings together 3 institutes:
 The International Institute of Technology (IIT).
 The International School of Architecture (ISA, a department of IIT).
 The International School of Business (ISB).

Theater 

The city had a municipal theater between 1903 and 1942, a building built by the architect Raphaël Guy according to a neo-Moorish architecture22, in line with the seat of the municipality and the Ramdanetru palace and being bombarded with the campaign of Tunisia which nevertheless targets the commercial port much further south of the city and during which the Frankish quarter was completely razed.

Festival 

The city of Sfax organizes the International Festival of Sfax, a summer event which welcomes artists from various countries.

Maison de France 
The French Institute of Sfax, commonly Maison de France (French House), is a space of meeting, reflection, and creation open to all and also of expression. Whose goal is to support and supervise the activities of the civil city and its artists. It was opened the 16 June 2006.

It has more than 40 000 visitors per year, and more than 50 cultural events. There is also a library that makes more than 20,000 documents available to the public.

Economy 

Sfax is the second industrial city the most important in Tunisia. The most important industries are leather and wool are also characterized by the cultivation of olive, almond, and fishing. It is also known for the people of Sfax mastering many traditional crafts and industries such as construction, handicrafts, carpentry, blacksmithing, and the production of the modern and traditional gold and silver.

Sectors 
Agriculture, especially olive cultivation, despite all these changes occupies an important place in the regional economy. Agricultural land occupies almost the entire area of the region (90%). The city produces on average 40% of the olive oil and 30% of the almonds of Tunisia, which makes it the first national producer. Another component of the Sfaxian economy is the exploitation of petroleum: the Miskar natural gas field covers a total area of 352 km2 and has a capacity of 22.7 billion m³. On there exploit 1.18 million tons per year.

Statistics 
The working population is divided between three sectors: agriculture and fishing (25.3%), services (25.6%), and manufacturing industries (24.4%).

Statistics of the sfaxian economy by sectors and field :

Agriculture 
 Cultivable land (S.A.U): 639,000 ha
 Irrigated Areas: 12,300 ha
 Forests and pastures: 118,000 ha

Fishing 
 Coastal fishing: 6,500 Tonnes
 Trawl fishing: 13,000 tonnes
 Tuna fishing: 2,700 tonnes
 Fire fishing: 1,140 tonnes
 Sponge and mussel peach: 417 tonnes

Energy 
 Oil: 1,2 millions m3
 Gas: 1,7 milliards m3

Transport

Motorways 

The A1 motorway connects Sfax with Tunis and also with Gabès that was inaugurated in 2017.
 Motorways :
 A1 : (Tunis, Gabès, Bouhajla, M'saken)
 Projects :
 National roads : (Kerkennah, Sidi Bouzid, Tataouine)

Railways 
A narrow-gauge railway system of SNCFT offers passenger services to Tunis and delivers phosphates and iron ore for export.

Airports 

Sfax is served by Sfax–Thyna International Airport and Syphax Airlines has regularly scheduled flights to Paris-Charles de Gaulle Airport, Montréal–Pierre Elliott Trudeau International Airport, Sabiha Gökçen International Airport, Tripoli International Airport, and charter flights to Jeddah Airport for the pilgrimage to Mecca.

Media 
Founded in 1961, Radio Sfax broadcasts twenty hours a day on MW 720 kHz/105.21 MHz.

There is also:
 Al Qalam TV
 Diwan FM
 Chams El-Janoub, hebdomadaire arabophone
 La Gazette du Sud, mensuel francophone

Sport 
Sfax has three sports clubs, for football, volleyball and basketball: CS Sfaxien, Sfax Railway Sport, Stade Sportif Sfaxien:

Notable people 
 Ahmed Abbes, mathematician
 Ali Abdi, professional footballer
 Max Azria, fashion designer
 Mamdouh Bahri, artist, composer, jazz guitarist, and teacher
 Hédi Bouraoui, poet and writer
 Nouri Bouzid, film director
 Hamdi Braa, basketball player
 Mohamed Charfi, academic, politician, jurist, and scholar
 Eoin Colfer, Irish author; worked in Sfax in the 1990s and set several of his books there
 Aymen Dahmen, professional footballer
 Moncef Dhouib, director and screenwriter
 Luciano Di Napoli (Sfax born), Italian pianist and conductor
 Tom Dixon, industrial designer
 Serge Dumont, business executive
 Mohamed Fourati, surgeon
 Mohamed Gouaida, footballer
 Farhat Hached, trade union leader assassinated by the French government
 Mohamed Jamoussi, artist, poet, composer, and famous singer
 Claude Kayat, Franco-Swedish writer and dramatist
 Mounir Laroussi, scientist, inventor
 Christian Lauba, composer
 Ali Maâloul, professional footballer
 Abdessalem Mseddi, former Minister of Higher Education, linguist, and writer
 Georges Perec, writer
 Hatem Trabelsi, former football player
 Saber Rebaï, Tunisian pan-Arab singer and composer
 Majida Boulila, Militant
 Mounir Lazzez, UFC Fighter

International relations

Twin towns – sister cities 
Sfax is twinned with:
  Grenoble, France
  Makhachkala, Russia
  Marburg, Germany
  Dakar, Senegal
  Oran, Algeria
  Safi, Morocco

Gallery

See also 

 Fossa regia
 Sfax War Cemetery
 Sufax, a possible etymon of Sfax
 Transport in Tunisia

References

Notes

External links 

 
 Sfaxonline.com
 Histoiredesfax.com
 CSS.org.tn

 
Populated places in Sfax Governorate
Communes of Tunisia
Cities in Tunisia
Mediterranean port cities and towns in Tunisia
Populated places established in the 9th century